Althaara is a 1964 Indian Malayalam-language film, directed and produced by P. Subramaniam. The film stars Prem Nazir, Sheela, Adoor Bhasi and K. S. Gopinath. The film had musical score by M. B. Sreenivasan.

Cast

 Prem Nazir
 Sheela
 Adoor Bhasi
 K. S. Gopinath
 Joseph Chacko
 Kanchana (old)
 Kottarakkara Sreedharan Nair
 Mary
 N. S. Ittan
 Paravoor Bharathan
 S. P. Pillai
 K. V. Shanthi

Soundtrack
The music was composed by M. B. Sreenivasan and the lyrics were written by Thirunayinaarkurichi Madhavan Nair.

References

External links
 

1964 films
1960s Malayalam-language films
Films directed by P. Subramaniam